The following lists events that happened during 1939 in Cape Verde.

Incumbents
Colonial governor: Amadeu Gomes de Figueiredo

Events
Cape Verde's first major and international airport (current Amílcar Cabral International Airport in the island of Sal) was built by the Italian government
CS Mindelense won the regional championship

References

 
1939 in the Portuguese Empire
Years of the 20th century in Cape Verde
1930s in Cape Verde
Cape Verde
Cape Verde